The 1980 French Open was a tennis tournament that took place on the outdoor clay courts at the Stade Roland Garros in Paris, France. The tournament ran from 26 May until 8 June. It was the 84th staging of the French Open, and the first Grand Slam tennis event of 1980.

Finals

Men's singles 

 Björn Borg defeated  Vitas Gerulaitis, 6–4, 6–1, 6–2 
It was Borg's 9th career Grand Slam title, and his 5th French Open title.

Women's singles

 Chris Evert defeated  Virginia Ruzici, 6–0, 6–3 
It was Evert's 10th career Grand Slam title, and her 4th French Open title.

Men's doubles

 Victor Amaya /  Hank Pfister defeated  Brian Gottfried /  Raúl Ramírez, 1–6, 6–4, 6–4, 6–3

Women's doubles

 Kathy Jordan /  Anne Smith defeated  Ivanna Madruga /  Adriana Villagrán, 6–1, 6–0

Mixed doubles

 Anne Smith /  Billy Martin defeated  Renáta Tomanová /  Stanislav Birner, 2–6, 6–4, 8–6

References

External links
 French Open official website

 
1980 Grand Prix (tennis)
1980 in French tennis
1980 in Paris

hi:1980 फ़्रेंच ओपन टेनिस प्रतियोगिता - पुरुष एकल